Madenli can refer to:

 Madenli, Aladağ
 Madenli, Çayeli, a town in Rize Province
 Madenli, Kurşunlu